was a Japanese track and field athlete. She competed in the women's shot put at the 1964 Summer Olympics.

References

1940 births
2023 deaths
Japanese female shot putters
Japanese female discus throwers
Olympic female shot putters
Olympic athletes of Japan
Athletes (track and field) at the 1964 Summer Olympics
Asian Games gold medalists for Japan
Asian Games silver medalists for Japan
Asian Games medalists in athletics (track and field)
Athletes (track and field) at the 1958 Asian Games
Athletes (track and field) at the 1962 Asian Games
Medalists at the 1958 Asian Games
Medalists at the 1962 Asian Games
Japan Championships in Athletics winners
20th-century Japanese women
21st-century Japanese women
Sportspeople from Iwate Prefecture